Evac may refer to:
 Evacuation (disambiguation)
 Air Evac, operator of helicopters and airplanes
 Evac (Transformers), fictional character